is a prefectural museum in Kanan, Ōsaka Prefecture, Japan dedicated to the area of Chikatsu Asuka during the Kofun and Asuka periods. The region is first documented in the Kojiki. The Chikatsu Asuka Fudoki-No-Oka Historical Park contains over two hundred burial mounds including four imperial tombs and those of Shōtoku Taishi and Ono no Imoko. The exhibition hall is divided into three sections: (1) Foreign influence during the Kofun and Asuka periods; (2) Kofun and the origins of the ancient realm; and (3) The application of science to cultural heritage. The museum was designed by Tadao Ando and opened in 1994.

See also
 List of Historic Sites of Japan (Ōsaka)

References

External links
 Chikatsu Asuka Museum
  Chikatsu Asuka Museum

Museums in Osaka Prefecture
History museums in Japan
Archaeological museums in Japan
Tadao Ando buildings
Museums established in 1994
1994 establishments in Japan
Kanan, Osaka